Deborah James may refer to:

 Deborah James (activist) (born 1971), American activist
 Deborah James (anthropologist), South African anthropologist
 Deborah James (journalist) (1981–2022), English journalist and podcast host
 Deborah Lee James (born 1958), American public servant who served as the 23rd Secretary of the Air Force